The University of Kentucky College of Dentistry (UKCD) is the dental school of the University of Kentucky. It is located in the city of Lexington, Kentucky, United States. It is one of two dental schools in Kentucky.

History 
The University of Kentucky College of Dentistry was established in 1962.

Academic Offerings 
In addition to the Doctor of Dental Medicine degree, the University of Kentucky College of Dentistry offers postdoctoral programs in six fields of study:
General Practice Dentistry
Oral and Maxillofacial Surgery
Orofacial Pain
Orthodontics
Pediatric Dentistry
Periodontics
All seven programs hold current and full accreditation by the Commission on Dental Accreditation (CODA).

Departments and Divisions 
Two departments and twelve divisions make up the college:
Department of Oral Health Practice
Division of Endodontics
Division of Oral Diagnosis, Oral Medicine and Oral and Maxillofacial Radiology
Division of Periodontology
Division of Restorative Dentistry
Division of Prosthodontics
Department of Oral Health Science
Division of Oral and Maxillofacial Surgery
Division of Pediatric Dentistry
Division of Adult Dentistry
Division of Oral Pathology
Division of Orofacial Pain
Division of Orthodontics
Division of Public Health Dentistry

References 

Dentistry
Dental schools in Kentucky
Educational institutions established in 1962
1962 establishments in Kentucky